Vijayalaya Chola (Tamil: விஜயாலய சோழன்) was a king of South India who founded the imperial Chola Empire. He ruled over the region to the north of the river Kaveri. Vijayalaya Chola is one of the descendants of famous Sangam age Chola king Karikala Chola. He was succeeded by his son Aditya Chola I, who laid the foundation of Imperial Chola Empire.

Dark age of Cholas
The ancient Chola kingdom once famous in Tamil literature and in the writings of Greek merchants and geographers faded into darkness after c. 300 CE. Cholas during this period almost completely disappeared from their native land. They seem to have held on to their old capital city of Uraiyur. This "dark" age of Tamil history came to an end with the ascendancy of the Pandyas and the Pallavas. The Cholas had to wait for another three centuries until the accession of Vijayalaya in the second quarter of the ninth century to re-establish their dynasty.

Cholas under Pandyas and Pallavas
We know very little of the fate of the Cholas in this long interval. What is certain however is that when the power of Cholas fell to the lowest ebb and that of the Pandyas and Pallavas rose to the north and south of them, this ancient dynasty was compelled to seek refuge and patronage under their more successful rivals. The Cholas, though not prominent or powerful as they were earlier were not completely in danger of extinction and continued to hold sway over a limited area consisting of what are the districts of Mayiladuturai, Chidambaram, Thanjavur, Trichy and Pudukkottai in modern Tamil Nadu.

Rise of Vijayalaya Chola
Making use of the opportunity during a war between Pandyas and Pallavas, Vijayalaya rose out of obscurity and captured Thanjavur. However, there is no substantiate proof to verify the claim regarding his obscure beginnings. For a very long time, historians could not trace the ancestry of Vijayalaya Chola, who is considered to be the founder of Medieval Chola dynasty. However, in recent times, historians and epigraphists in the wake of Eastern Chalukyan king's Copper plate grants, Anbil plates of Parantaka Chola II and Velanjeri plates  of Parantaka I believe that Vijayalaya chola might well belong to the Cholas lineage, who themselves trace their ancestry to the ancient Tamil King, Karikala Cholan.   At this time there was a great struggle going on between the Pallavas and the Pandyas for the political supremacy of South India.  In this disturbed state of affairs, Vijayalaya seems to have found a good opportunity to defeat the Pandyas, and make himself the ruler of Thanjavur and the surrounding Chola country. He also defeated the Pallavas.

Vijayalaya Chola conquered Thanjavur from Elango Mutharaiyar who was the final ruler of Mutharaiyar dynasty. It is said that in the year 852 CE Vijayalaya Chola waged war with Pandya's and defeated the latter. Making use of the opportunity during a war between Pandyas and Pallavas, Vijayalaya rose and established the Chola kingdom at Thanjavur with help of Muttaraiyar king Sattan Paliyilli (826–852 CE). Cholas became so powerful that the Pallavas were also wiped out from the Thanjavur region at a later stage.

Pandyan invasion
After Vijayalaya’s capture of Thanjavur, the Pandyan king Varagunavarman II (c. 862 – 885 CE) became a subordinate ally of the Pallava Nandivarman III (c. 846 – 869 CE). Nandhivarman wished to curtail the growing influence of Chola power under Vijayalaya and called upon the Varagunavarman to help suppress Vijayalaya. Varaguna led an expedition into the Chola country. The Pandyan army reached the north bank of the Kaveri near Thanjavur and for a while the Chola revival looked short lived. Vijayalaya, by this time a veteran of many battles, was aging and was an invalid.By this time Vijayalaya lost his kingdom to the Pandyas as his son Aditya I was very weak and he became a tax paying king under the Pandya reign but the Cholas who succeeded him conquered the Pandya kingdom.

Inscriptions of Vijayalaya
The Tiruvalangadu plates state that Vijayalaya captured the city of Tanjavur and made it his capital and that he also built in it a temple to the goddess Nisumbhasudani (Durga).  The Kanyakumari inscription states that he renovated the city of Tanjore.

Vijayalaya took the title of Parakesarivarman. Chola kings succeeding him took the titles of Parakesari and Rajakesari in turns. This is probably to acknowledge their supposed ancestors Parakesari and Rajakesari.

Narttamalai, Pudukkottai has a solesvara temple attributed to Vijayalaya.

Notes

References
 Tamil And Sanskrit Inscriptions Chiefly Collected In 1886 - 87, E. Hultzsch, Ph.D., Published by Archaeological Survey of India, New Delhi
 Nilakanta Sastri, K. A. (1935). The CōĻas, University of Madras, Madras (Reprinted 1984).
 Nilakanta Sastri, K. A. (1955). A History of South India, OUP, New Delhi (Reprinted 2002).

Chola kings
870s deaths
Year of birth unknown
9th-century Hindus
9th-century Indian monarchs